Bhalchandra Madhav Udgaonkar, popularly as B.M. Udgaonkar, was an Indian theoretical particle physicist, scientist, educationist and the co-editor of A Nuclear-Weapon-Free World: Desirable?, Feasible?. His contributions have been reported in the development of Homi Bhabha Centre for Science Education (HBCSE), Institute of Physics, Bhubaneswar and Marathi Vidnyan Parishad (MaViPa). An alumnus of the Raja Shivaji Vidyalaya (erstwhile King George School), he is a member of the Institute of Advanced Study, USA, a scientists' community, and a former president of the Marathi Vidnyan Parishad. He is the author of several books and has contributed content to books written by others. The Government of India awarded him the third highest civilian honour of the Padma Bhushan, in 1985, for his contributions to science and technology.

References 

Recipients of the Padma Bhushan in science & engineering
Indian particle physicists
Indian scientific authors
20th-century Indian educational theorists
1927 births
2014 deaths
Marathi people
20th-century Indian physicists
Scientists from Maharashtra